Margaux Châtelier (born March 21, 1990) is a French actress known for her role in the 2013 film Belle and Sebastian and its 2015 sequel, Belle & Sebastian: The Adventure Continues. She appeared as Annalise de Marillac in the Starz series Outlander in 2016.

Filmography

References

External links
 
 

French film actresses
French television actresses
Living people
1990 births